Christian Ansgar Welp (January 2, 1964 – March 1, 2015) was a German professional basketball player. He played three seasons in the NBA. He was the MVP of the 1993 EuroBasket.

College career
Welp became the leading scorer in Washington Huskies history, as a college basketball player. He scored 2,073 points for the Huskies, and was a three-time All-Pac-10 Conference selection. Welp was the Pac-10 Player of the Year in 1986, and helped lead the Huskies to consecutive conference regular-season titles. Welp was inducted into the Husky Hall of Fame, in 2001.

Professional career

NBA 
Welp was selected 16th overall, in the National Basketball Association (NBA)'s 1987 draft, by the Philadelphia 76ers, and he played three seasons in the NBA. In December 1987, he slipped on a wet court in Chicago, the night after a Blackhawks' hockey game. Welp remembered, "There was condensation on the floor, and the ball boys were mopping the floor the whole game," and the injury "was so severe, my knee never got back to the level it was before. But no excuses."

He was traded by the 76ers, along with Maurice Cheeks and David Wingate, to the San Antonio Spurs, in exchange for Johnny Dawkins and Jay Vincent, during the off-season of 1989.

He was used sparingly by the Spurs, before being traded to the Golden State Warriors, in exchange for Uwe Blab (another German-born NBA center), at the trade deadline, during the 1989–90 NBA season. After a handful of games with the Warriors, his NBA career ended.

Europe 
From 1990 to 1996, Welp played in Germany, with Bayer Leverkusen, with which he won six German national league championships and three German Cups. For the 1996–97 season, Welp played with the Greek League club Olympiacos, winning the EuroLeague title with them (and also the Triple Crown). In the 1997–98 season, he played with the German league club Alba Berlin.

He also played with the Italian league club Viola Reggio Calabria, during the 1998–99 season.

National team career
Welp won the gold medal at the EuroBasket 1993, as a player for the senior Germany national team. He scored the decisive last points in the tournament's final. He was voted MVP of that tournament.

Coaching career
Welp worked as an assistant basketball coach for the senior Germany national team until 2006.

Personal life and death
After Welp retired from playing professional basketball in 1999, he lived in Seattle, Washington, with his wife, Melanie, and three children. He worked at a construction-supply business in Woodinville, for Tim Burnham, a former football player, with whom he had become friends during college.

Welp died on March 1, 2015, of heart failure. He was at a vacation home on Hood Canal, that he had purchased just after being drafted in 1987. He had been complaining of chest pains, and was planning to see a doctor. Welp's sons Collin and Nic both practiced basketball with their father; Collin later played for the UC Irvine Anteaters men's basketball team.

References

External links
NBA stats @ databasebasketball.com

1964 births
2015 deaths
Alba Berlin players
Basketball players at the 1984 Summer Olympics
Centers (basketball)
FIBA EuroBasket-winning players
German basketball coaches
German expatriate basketball people in the United States
German expatriates in Greece
German expatriates in Italy
Golden State Warriors players
Greek Basket League players
National Basketball Association players from Germany
German men's basketball players
Olympiacos B.C. players
Olympic basketball players of West Germany
People from Delmenhorst
Philadelphia 76ers draft picks
Philadelphia 76ers players
San Antonio Spurs players
Sportspeople from Lower Saxony
Basketball players from Seattle
Viola Reggio Calabria players
Washington Huskies men's basketball players
1986 FIBA World Championship players